The Carlos Palanca Memorial Awards for Literature winners in the year 1989 (rank, title of winning entry, name of author).


English division
Short story
First prize: “Stories” by Cesar Ruiz Aquino
Second prize: “Afternoon Fever” by Eli Ang Barroso; and “The 3 Juans and How They Joined the Revolution” by Maria Fe G. Parco
Third prize: “Owl” by Charlson Ong; and “The Doubters” by Timothy R. Montes

Short story for children
First prize: “The Great Green Grove of Ato” by Gretchen B. Ira
Second prize: “The Boy Who Listened to the Sea” by Ma. Elena Paterno-Locsin; and “The Offering to the Sea” by Ma. Elena Paterno-Locsin
Third prize: “The Little Girl Who Saved her Yawn” by Amado Lacuesta Jr. and Andrea P. Lacuesta; and "The Vacant Lot" by Leoncio P. Deriada

Poetry
First prize: “Poems in Our Own Sweet Country” by Francis Macansantos
Second prize: “All Else is Grass” by Rene Estrella Amper; and “Angel of Stone” by Ma. Fatima V. Lim
Third prize: “Faces and Masks” by Eli Ang Barroso; “Fear in the World” by Clovis Nazareno; and “Nearness of the Sea” by Juaniyo Arcellana

Essay
First prize: “Discourse of Power in Florante at Laura” by Florentino Hornedo; and “Threading Our Lives of the Story of the Open Strand” by Marjorie Evasco
Second prize: No winner
Third prize: “The Changing of the Guard: Three Critical Essays” by Jaime An Lim; and “The Visitors and the Native in Filipino Folk and Popular Literature” by Florentino Hornedo

One-act play
First prize: No winner
Second prize: “Brisbane” by Bobby Flores Villasis
Third prize: No winner

Full-length play
First prize: “A Time to Love” by Ametta Suarez-Taguchi
Second prize: “Candle in the Wind” by Jessie B. Garcia
Third prize: “Angst” by Jomar Fleras

Filipino division
Short story
First prize: “Minero” by Noel Salonga
Second prize: “Ikaw, Ang Aking Saksi”ii by Ariel Valerio
Third prize: “Ulahing” by Rowena Festin

Short story for children
First prize: “Pamana ng Bundok” by Edgardo B. Maranan
Second prize: “Yawyawen: Munting Lam-Ang” by Pat V. Villafuerte
Third prize: “Bertdey ni Guido” by Rene O. Villanueva; and "Sa Bayang Walang Batas" by Rene O. Villanueva

Poetry
First prize: “Batanes at Iba pang Pulo” by Tomas F. Agulto; and “Himutok at Iba Pa” by Rolando S. Tinio
Second prize: “Lupang di Hinirang” by Merlinda Bobis; and “San Isidro, Safehouse, Mga Panaginip at iba pang Tula” by Donato Mejia Alvarez
Third prize: “Ang Aking Mga Kapatid” by Romeo J. Santos; and “Mga Tula ng Paglusong” by Romulo P. Baquiran Jr.

Essay
First prize: “Subersiyon ng Romansa: Kamalayang Balagtas ng Teatro...” by Buenaventura S. Medina Jr.
Second prize: “Ang Abril ng Laksa-laksa Kong Pangarap” by Anacleta Encarnacion
Third prize: “Ang Dula sa Ating Dulaan” by Rolando S. Tinio

One-act play
First prize: “Gamugamo sa Kanto ng East Avenue” by Rolando Dela Cruz
Second prize: “Bulong-bulongan sa Sangandaan” by Ramon C. Jocson
Third prize: “Isang Magsasaka” by Reuel Molina Aguila

Full-length play
First prize: “Pwera Usog” by Manuel R. Buising
Second prize: “Muling Pag-ibig” by Bonifacio Ilagan
Third prize: “Ang Buhay ay Pelikula” by Dennis Marasigan

References
 

Palanca Awards
Palanca Awards, 1989